Spoorloos (Trackless) is a South African crime drama anthology television series created by Ilse van Hemert and developed by Ochre Moving Pictures. The first season is based on the 2014 novel Daddy Long Legs by Vernon W. Baumann and set in the fictional town of Digtersdal in the Eastern Cape. Each subsequent season follows a new small town and cast of characters.

The first season premiered on kykNET on 6 October 2018. The second season Spoorloos: Heksejag premiered on 14 July 2020. The third installment Spoorloos: Steynhof, set in the Northern Cape, premiered on 6 July 2021. In November 2021, it was renewed for a fourth season, which premiered on 19 July 2022 as Spoorloos: Die Eiland.

Cast

Season 1

Main

Recurring
 Kagiso Rathebe as Sbu Mahlaba
 Hannes van Wyk as Meneer Immelman
 Ashley Taylor as Adjudant Deon Prinsloo
 Sibulele Gcilitshana as Kaptein Miya
 Nikolai Mynhardt as Sersant Potgieter
 Andre Odendaal as Piet "Pille" Taljaart
 Francois Jacobs as Junior Malan
 Lizz Meiring as Marie Fick
 Antoinette Louw as Petro Els
 Natania van Heerden as Bernice Botha
 Vuyisile Pandle as Col. Mkhize
 Jeffrey Moss as Tyrell September
 Eloise Clasen as Stella
 Francois Viljoen as Charl
 Craig Gardner as Bradley
 Niel Slabbert as Jan-Gustav Malan
}}

Season 2: Heksejag

Main

Recurring and guest

Season 3: Steynhof

Main

Recurring and guest

Season 4: Die Eiland

Main

Recurring and guest

Production

Development
Ilse van Hemert created Spoorloos. Christo Davids joined the production team for the second season. He was then promoted to head writer and director for the series' third season.

Casting
The cast of the third season was confirmed in June 2022, including Stiaan Smith, Jane de Wet, Brent Vermeulen, Diaan Lawrenson, Arno Marais, Eloise Clasen, Vinette Ebrahim, Ivan D. Lucas, Wayne van Rooyen, Franci Swanepoel, and Kim Cloete.

In May 2022, it was announced singer Bobby van Jaarsveld would be making his debut in the fourth season Die Eiland. The rest of the cast was confirmed ahead of the season's premiere in July 2022, including Izel Bezuidenhout, Armand Aucamp, Tiaan Slabbert, Leché Joubert, Deon Coetzee, Marisa Drummond, Hannes van Wyk, Robyn Roussouw, Ilse Klink, Brendon Daniels, Esmeralda Bihl, and Donovan Pietersen.

Release
Principal photography for the first season took place in Cradock and Johannesburg.

References

External links
 
 Spoorloos at TVSA

2018 South African television series debuts
2010s anthology television series
2010s crime drama television series
2010s South African television series
2020s anthology television series
2020s crime drama television series
2020s South African television series
Afrikaans-language television shows
kykNET original programming
South African drama television series
Television series about fictional serial killers
Television shows based on novels